Bosc-Bérenger is a commune in the Seine-Maritime department in the Normandy region in northern France.

Geography
The A29 autoroute and the A28 autoroute surround the village on 2 of its 3 sides.

Population

Places of interest
 The church of the Trinity, dating from the twelfth century.

See also
Communes of the Seine-Maritime department

References

Communes of Seine-Maritime